The Supermarine Stranraer is a flying boat designed and built by the British Supermarine Aviation Works company at Woolston, Southampton. It was developed during the 1930s on behalf of its principal operator, the Royal Air Force (RAF). It was the RAF's last and fastest biplane flying boat.

Derived from the Supermarine Scapa, the aircraft's design was heavily shaped by Specification R.24/31, issued in 1931. After an initial rejection by the Air Ministry, Supermarine persisted with development as a private venture under the designation Southampton V. During 1933, a contract was placed for a single prototype; it was around this time that the type was named the Stranraer. First flown on 24 July 1934, the Stranraer entered frontline service with the RAF during 1937; most examples of the type were in service by the outbreak of World War II.

The Stranraers typically undertook anti-submarine and convoy escort patrols during the early years of the conflict. During March 1941, the model was withdrawn from frontline service, but continued to be operated in a training capacity until October 1942. In addition to the British-built aeroplanes, the Canadian Vickers company in Montreal, Quebec, also manufactured 40 Stranraers under licence for the Royal Canadian Air Force (RCAF). These Canadian Stranraers served in anti-submarine and coastal defence capacities on both Canada's Atlantic and Pacific coasts, and were in regular service until 1946. Following their withdrawal from military service, many ex-RCAF Stranraers were sold off to fledgling regional airlines, with whom they served in various commercial passenger and freighter operations into the 1950s.

Design and development

Background

The Supermarine Stranraer, which was directly derived from the Supermarine Scapa, was the final aircraft in a series of flying boats designed by R. J. Mitchell, for the Royal Air Force (RAF). It was produced by Supermarine at Woolston, Southampton, in southern England between 1925 and 1936. Development of the series commenced during the early 1930s, with Supermarine's design team, headed by Mitchell.

The project was pursued in a response to the Air Ministry's issuing of Specification R.24/31, issued in 1931, which called for a general purpose coastal reconnaissance flying boat for the RAF. This specification listed various requirements, including a payload capacity  greater than that of the Scapa and the ability to maintain level flight on only a single engine, neither of which were within the capabilities of the Scapa without enlargement. Thus, Supermarine submitted its initial response to the specification as a larger model of the Scapa; the company competed against a rival bid from Saunders-Roe.

The Air Ministry favoured Saunders-Roe's proposal and rejected Supermarine's design. Despite the rejection, Supermarine opted to continue development work on the design as a private venture, which was first known as the Supermarine Southampton V.

Prototypes and production
In 1933, a contract was placed for a single prototype powered by two  Bristol Pegasus IIIM engines and the type was named the Stranraer. On 27 July 1934, the first prototype, K3973, conducted its maiden flight, piloted by Joseph Summers. Over the following months, a relatively intense initial flight test programme was conducted. On 24 October 1934, the Stranraer prototype was delivered to the Marine Aircraft Experimental Establishment (MAEE) at RAF Felixstowe for official trials. 

On 29 August 1935, quickly after the completion of proving flights, an initial order for 17 aircraft (serial numbers K7287 to K7303) was placed by the Air Ministry to fulfil Specification 17/35; six more aircraft  (K9676 to K9681) were ordered in May 1936. The first production standard aircraft made its first flight in December 1936, and entered service operation with the RAF on 16 April 1937. The final Stranraer was delivered on 3 April 1939. In addition, a total of 40 Stranraers were manufactured under licence in Canada by Canadian Vickers Limited, as both Supermarine and Canadian Vickers were subsidiaries of Vickers-Armstrongs.

Description

The Stranraer was a six-seater, twin-engined biplane flying boat. The all-metal frame was designed to avoid soakage. The hull was made of an inner layer of Duralumin and outer layers of pure aluminium, which provided resistance to corrosion. The enlarged diameter of the hull made it wide enough across to increase the internal space of the dual-control cockpit.

As the design of the Stranraer progressed, it deviated to a greater extent from the Scapa, opting for an alternative thin-wing arrangement around a two-bay structure. The Stranraer's weight, and the surface area and span of its wings, were 12 percent greater; the elevator was also 7 percent larger, while the rudders featured trim tabs capable of holding the aircraft straight under single-engine flight. While some consideration towards adopting the Rolls-Royce Kestrel was made, the moderately supercharged Bristol Pegasus IIIM radial engine was selected instead, as it was an air-cooled type, having no need of heavy radiators and pipes. While the airframe of the Stranraer was broadly similar to the Scapa, it was cleaner in terms of its aerodynamics. Much of the airframe was composed of alclad, while detailed fittings were fabricated from stainless steel; metallic objects were anodised as an anti-corrosion measure. For additional structural strength, a pair of interplane struts were introduced. The hull was considerably larger, its cross-section being increased by 18 percent, yet still achieving virtually identical hydrodynamic performance. The forward gun was redesigned to be retractable, the middle gunner's position was lowered, and a tail gunner position was added just aft of the control surfaces, completed with a hooded windshield. In general, the equipment of which the aircraft was to be fitted with were the result of lessons learnt from operations of the earlier Southamptons.

The production model of the Stranraer was different in a few aspects from the first prototype, chiefly of which being the installation of the more powerful  Pegasus X engine. The engines were placed in nacelles under the upper wing, a position which has the advantage that the propellers were well clear of any sea spray. Two petrol tanks, each of  capacity, were placed in the centre section of the top plane; petrol was fed by gravity, but fuel pumps were also incorporated.

The two-bladed wooden propellers of the prototype were replaced by Fairey-Reed propellers when the aircraft went into production, which were made of metal and had three blades. The redesigned wings were fabric-covered. The wings were redesigned to incorporate twin bays; the greater number of struts and wires used for the bays, which would have caused an increase in drag, meant the wings had to have a thinner profile. The wings were swept back to correct the balance.

The Stranraer was armed with three  Lewis guns, positioned in the nose, dorsal and tail.

Operational history

Military use prior to September 1939
The Stranraer and its contemporary, the Saro London, were the last multi-engine, biplane flying-boats to see service with the RAF. The RAF operated 17 Stranraers from 1937, although they were already considered obsolete when they entered service. Before the war, the type served primarily with No. 228 Squadron, No. 209 Squadron and No. 240 Squadron. Generally, the aircraft was not well-received, with numerous pilots considering its performance being typically marginal. Others noted that it had superior seaworthiness to several aircraft in common use, such as the Consolidated PBY Catalina. As early as 1938, some Stranraer squadrons had begun to re-equip themselves with other aircraft, such as the Short Sunderland and Short Singapore flying boats.

Early on in its career, the Stranraer performed several challenging long-distance flights; one such flight, covering , was performed during a single exercise during September 1938.

Action during the Second World War
No Stranraers saw action away from UK territorial waters during World War II. Immediately following the outbreak of the war in September 1939, Stranraers patrolled the North Sea, intercepting enemy shipping between Scotland and Norway. Aircraft assigned to such duties were typically armed with bombs underneath one wing and a single overload fuel tank underneath the other one. Use of the Stranraer for such patrols came to an end on 17 March 1941. Stranraers saw service with No. 240 Squadron, and limited numbers were deployed at the No. 4 (Coastal) Operational Training Unit. The final Stranraer flight in RAF service was conducted by K7303 at Felixstowe on 30 October 1942.

Having acquired a less than favourable reception by flight and ground crews alike, the Stranraer gained a large number of derisive nicknames during its service life. It was sometimes referred to as a "whistling shithouse" because the toilet opened out directly to the air and when the seat was lifted, the airflow caused the toilet to make a whistling sound. The Stranraer also acquired "Flying Meccano Set", "The Marpole Bridge", "Seymour Seine Net", "Strainer", "Flying Centre Section of the Lion's Gate Bridge", as well as a more genteel variant of its usual nickname, "Whistling Birdcage".

The Royal Canadian Air Force (RCAF) Stranraers were exact equivalents of their RAF counterparts. In Canadian service, they were usually employed in coastal patrol against submarine threats in a similar role to the British Stranraers. Aviation author Dirk Septer stated that no enemy action was ever recorded by the RCAF's Stranraers. However, the crew of a 5 Squadron Stranraer, flown by Flight Lieutenant Leonard Birchall, were responsible for the capture of an Italian merchant ship, the Capo Nola, in the Gulf of Saint Lawrence, hours after Canada issued its declaration of war on Italy on 10 June 1940. The Canadian Vickers-built Stranraers served with the RCAF throughout the war, the last example being withdrawn on 20 January 1946.

Civilian use
From May 1935, the Stranraer was developed for civilian use into the Type 237. All the RCAF's Stranraers were struck off charge between June 1939 and January 1946. Of the 40 aircraft acquired by the RCAF, half survived being destroyed or damaged during the war. In November 1944, 20 aircraft that had been withdrawn from active service in February earlier that year were purchased for civilian use, before being registered in Canada or the US.

After the end of World War II, 13 examples were sold through Crown Assets (Canadian government) and passed into civilian use; several served with Queen Charlotte Airlines (QCA) in British Columbia, operating until 1958. A re-engine project by the airline substituted  Wright GR-1820-G202GA engines in place of the original Pegasus units.

Queen Charlotte Airlines became at one point the third-largest airline in Canada; it was popularly known as the Queer Collection of Aircraft. With limited money, it flew a mixture of types that were often the cast-offs of other operators. In QCA use, the Stranraer gained a more suitable reputation and was "well liked" by its crews. A total of eight surplus Stranraers were also sold to Aero Transport Ltd. of Tampa, Florida.

Operators

Military
  

RCAF – Operational Squadrons of the Home War Establishment (HWE) (Based in Canada)
Eastern Air Command
No. 5 Squadron RCAF Used Supermarine Stranraer (Nov 38 – Sep 41)
No. 117 Squadron RCAF Used Supermarine Stranraer (Sep 41 – Oct 41)
Western Air Command
No. 4 Squadron RCAF Used Supermarine Stranraer (Jul 39 – Sep 43)
No. 6 Squadron RCAF Used Supermarine Stranraer (Nov 41 – May 43)
No. 7 Squadron RCAF Used Supermarine Stranraer (Feb 43 – Mar 44)
No. 9 Squadron RCAF Used Supermarine Stranraer (Dec 41 – Apr 43)
No. 13 (OT) Squadron RCAF Used Supermarine Stranraer (Oct 41 – Nov 42)
No. 120 Squadron RCAF Used Supermarine Stranraer (Nov 41 – Oct 43)
 (OT)-Operational Training;
 

 Royal Air Force
 No. 201 Squadron RAF
 No. 209 Squadron RAF
 No. 210 Squadron RAF
 No. 228 Squadron RAF
 No. 240 Squadron RAF

Civilian

 Aero Transport Ltd.

 Pacific Western Airlines
 Queen Charlotte Airlines
 Wardair

Specifications

Surviving aircraft

A single Stranraer, 920/CF-BXO, survives in the collection of the Royal Air Force Museum London. This aircraft was built in 1940, one of 40 produced by Canadian Vickers. In service with the RCAF, it flew with several squadrons, on anti-submarine patrols, as a training aircraft and carrying passengers. In 1944, it was disposed of. It was flown by the civilian airline Canadian Pacific Airlines until 1947, then by Queen Charlotte Airlines, who replaced its original engines with American Wright R-1820 Cyclone engines. Queen Charlotte Airlines flew the aircraft on passenger flights until 1952, flying from Vancouver along the Pacific coast of British Columbia. It flew with several other private owners until it was damaged by a ship in 1966. In 1970, it was bought by the RAF Museum and transported to the UK.

Parts of a second Stranraer, 915/CF-BYJ, are owned by the Shearwater Aviation Museum, Halifax, Canada. This aircraft also operated with Queen Charlotte Airlines until it crashed on Christmas Eve 1949 at Belize Inlet, British Columbia. Most of the aircraft was recovered in the 1980s, with the exception of the forward fuselage and cockpit.

See also

 Short Knuckleduster

Notes

References

Sources

Further reading

External links

 Canada's Air Force: Supermarine Stranraer

1930s British military reconnaissance aircraft
Aircraft first flown in 1934
Biplanes
Flying boats
Stranraer
Twin piston-engined tractor aircraft